The 1990 Men's Ice Hockey World Championships was the 55th such event sanctioned by the International Ice Hockey Federation (IIHF), and at the same time served as the 65th Ice Hockey European Championships. Teams representing 28 countries participated in several levels of competition. The competition also served as qualifications for group placements in the 1991 competition.

The top Championship Group A tournament took place in Switzerland from 16 April to 2 May 1990, with games played in Bern and Fribourg. Eight teams took part, with each team playing each other once. The four best teams then played each other once more. The Soviet Union became world champions for the 22nd and last time, and Sweden won their 10th European title. In the European Championships, only matches between European teams in the first round were counted towards scoring.

Group B saw East Germany participate in the World Championships for the final time.

World Championship Group A (Switzerland)

First round

Final Round

Consolation round

Norway needing to keep their final game within four goals, lost four to nothing to the Germans, and were relegated.
Following the reunification of Germany, the Federal Republic of Germany ceased being referred to as West Germany and, starting in 1991, was simply referred to as Germany

World Championship Group B (France)
Played in Lyon and Megève 29 March to 8 April.

Switzerland was promoted to Group A.  The Netherlands would have been relegated but gained a reprieve when East Germany ceased to participate because of the reunification of Germany.

World Championship Group C (Hungary)
Played in Budapest Hungary 28 March to 8 April.

Yugoslavia was promoted to Group B.  Both Belgium and South Korea were reprieved from relegation as the reunification of Germany left Group B one team short, and Group D was shut down as there were not enough teams.

World Championship Group D (Great Britain)
Played in Cardiff, Great Britain 20–25 March.

Great Britain was promoted to Group C.

Ranking and statistics

Tournament Awards
Best players selected by the directorate:
Best Goaltender:       Artūrs Irbe
Best Defenceman:       Mikhail Tatarinov
Best Forward:          Steve Yzerman
Media All-Star Team:
Goaltender:  Dominik Hašek
Defence:  Viacheslav Fetisov,  Mikhail Tatarinov
Forwards:  Andrei Khomutov,  Robert Reichel,  Steve Yzerman

Final standings
The final standings of the tournament according to IIHF:

European championships final standings
The final standings of the European championships according to IIHF:

Scoring leaders
List shows the top skaters sorted by points, then goals.
Source:

Leading goaltenders
Only the top five goaltenders, based on save percentage, who have played 50% of their team's minutes are included in this list.
Source:

Citations

References
Complete results

IIHF Men's World Ice Hockey Championships
I
Men
April 1990 sports events in Europe
May 1990 sports events in Europe
Sports competitions in Bern
20th century in Bern
Fribourg
International ice hockey competitions hosted by France
International ice hockey competitions hosted by Hungary
International ice hockey competitions hosted by the United Kingdom
1989–90 in French ice hockey
1989–90 in Hungarian ice hockey
1989–90 in British ice hockey
March 1990 sports events in Europe
Sports competitions in Lyon
20th century in Lyon
1990s in Budapest
International sports competitions in Budapest
Sports competitions in Cardiff
1990 in Welsh sport
1990s in Cardiff
Ice hockey competitions in Wales